Saint Charles Borromeo Seminary is a Roman Catholic seminary in Wynnewood, Pennsylvania that is under the jurisdiction of the Archdiocese of Philadelphia.  The oldest Catholic institution of higher learning in the Philadelphia region, the school is named after Charles Borromeo, an Italian saint from the Counter-Reformation.  As of April 2022, Auxiliary Bishop Timothy C. Senior was president of Saint Charles.

The campus is in the municipality of Lower Merion Township.

History

St. Charles was founded in 1832 by Bishop Francis Kenrick in his home on Fifth Street in Philadelphia. In 1838, it was chartered by the Commonwealth of Pennsylvania to grant academic degrees. Saint Charles later moved to a building on the corner of Fifth and Prune Streets, then to the rectory of Saint Mary's Parish on Fourth Street.  It then moved to a facility on the corner of Eighteenth and Race Streets in Philadelphia.

In 1863, then Bishop James F. Wood made the first of three property purchases to create a new Saint Charles campus in the Overbrook section of Philadelphia. In September, 1871, the preparatory college and theology divisions were reunited in Overbrook. In December, 1875, Archbishop Wood dedicated the Chapel of the Immaculate Conception on the campus. Later archbishops of Philadelphia have initiated improvements on the Saint Charles campus. 

 Archbishop Patrick J. Ryan began the construction of the Memorial Library Building
 Archbishop Edmond Prendergast oversaw the building of a student residence hall. 
 Cardinal Dennis Dougherty sponsored the construction of the college building.
 Cardinal John O'Hara added an indoor swimming pool.
 Cardinal John Krol in 1971 build a residence hall and multi-purpose building dedicated to John Vianney, a 19th century French saint.

In 2005, the Anthony Cardinal Bevilacqua Research Center was established at the Ryan Memorial Library. The building was completely renovated in the process. The buildings that make up the current Theology Division. along with the Ryan Memorial Library. stand at the western end of campus. The College Seminary is located at the eastern end.

For an eleven-year period, the preparatory division of the seminary was located at Glen Riddle, Pennsylvania. The preparatory program was equivalent to the junior and senior years of and four years of college. The high school program was discontinued in 1968.  In 1999, an alumnus praised Saint Charles for its liturgical conservatism compared to some other US seminaries. Cardinal Anthony Bevilacqua, a former archbishop of Philadelphia, lived at Saint Charles in his retirement. Both Pope John Paul II and Cardinal Joseph Ratzinger visited Saint Charles, and Pope Francis stayed there during his 2015 visit to Philadelphia. 

In 2019, Saint Charles sold its Wynnewood property to Main Line Health.  Saint Charles was planning to move by 2025 to a new campus at Gwynedd Mercy University in Lower Gwynedd, Pennsylvania.

Academics
St. Charles is accredited by the Middle States Commission on Higher Education and the Association of Theological Schools in the United States and Canada. It consists of four divisions: 

 College Seminary 
 Theological Seminary 
 School of Theological Studies
 School of Diaconal Formation 

Candidates for the Catholic priesthood pursue a five-year liberal arts curriculum (which includes a spiritual year), followed by a four-year curriculum within the Theological Seminary. St. Charles offers the following degrees:

 Bachelor of Arts
 Master of Arts
 Master of Divinity

Enrollment
At the start of the 2020-2021 academic year, Saint Charles added 27 male students. The total enrollment of 156 seminarians was studying for the Archdiocese of Philadelphia, 12 partner dioceses, and six religious orders. Saint Charles's partner dioceses include: 

 Diocese of Allentown
 Diocese of Arlington
 Diocese of Bridgeport
 Diocese of Greensburg
 Diocese of Harrisburg
 Diocese of Lincoln
 Diocese of Raleigh
 Diocese of Trenton
 Diocese of Mymensingh in Bangladesh 
 Diocese of Steubenville
 Ukrainian Archeparchy of Philadelphia
 Archdiocese for the Military Services, USA
 Archdiocese of Colombo in Sri Lanka

The partner religious congregations and orders include:

 Order of the Blessed Virgin Mary of Mercy
 Vincentians
 Order of Canons Regular of Prémontré
 Sodalitium Christianae Vitae
 Oratory of Saint Philip Neri
 Congregation of the Oratory
 Society of the Catholic Apostolate

List of rectors

Notable alumni

Bishops 
Edward Joseph Adams
Thaddeus Amat y Brusi
Edward Barron
Eusebius J. Beltran
Herbert Bevard
Caspar Henry Borgess
Michael Joseph Bransfield
Francis Brennan
Michael Francis Burbidge
Joseph R. Cistone
Edward Peter Cullen
Joseph R. Cistone
Louis A. DeSimone
Francis X. DiLorenzo
Michael Domenec
Dennis Joseph Dougherty
Michael J. Fitzgerald
Edmond Fitzmaurice
John T. Folda
John Patrick Foley
Ronald William Gainer
Joseph Anthony Galante
Gregory W. Gordon
James Green
Edward Hughes
Francis Edward Hyland
William Henry Keeler
Peter Richard Kenrick
Joseph Edward Kurtz
Hugh L. Lamb
George L. Leech
Martin Nicholas Lohmuller
Stephen Lowe
Robert P. Maginnis
Joseph Francis Martino
Joseph P. McFadden 
Eugene J. McGuinness
John J. McIntyre
Joseph Mark McShea
James O'Connor
John Joseph O'Connor
Michael O'Connor
Joseph A. Pepe 
Nelson J. Perez
Edmond Francis Prendergast
Kevin C. Rhoades
Stephen V. Ryan
Francis B. Schulte
Timothy C. Senior
Daniel E. Thomas
David B. Thompson
Thomas Jerome Welsh

References

External links
Official website

 
Roman Catholic Archdiocese of Philadelphia
1832 establishments in Pennsylvania